Frederick William Calcut Paxford (5 August 1898, Fifield, Oxfordshire – 10 August 1979, Churchill, Oxfordshire) was C. S. Lewis's gardener and handyman at The Kilns from 1930 until Lewis's death in 1963. He is said to have been the inspiration for Puddleglum the Marsh-Wiggle in The Silver Chair in the Chronicles of Narnia:  "an inwardly optimistic, outwardly pessimistic, dear, frustrating, shrewd countryman of immense integrity."

Paxford, an Oxfordshire countryman, was born the same year as Lewis and had been gassed as a soldier during World War I. He had been working at The Kilns when Lewis bought the property in 1930 and hired him as a gardener and factotum. Paxford spent several years clearing the grounds and establishing an orchard and vegetable garden. He acted as a chauffeur to Lewis, who could not drive, and did the shopping for the household with a great sense of economy. He sang hymns in a loud voice, much to the annoyance of the neighbours, "but it was the incessant gloominess of his predictions, especially about the weather, that  caught people's attention and led to his employment as the model for Puddleglum the Marsh-Wiggle in The Silver Chair."

Douglas Gresham, Lewis's stepson, wrote of Paxford: 

A lifelong bachelor, Paxford died in 1979 aged 81 in his home in Churchill. His 
reminiscences about Lewis (along with those of others) have been published in a collected volume.

In the 1993 movie Shadowlands, Fred Paxford is played by Walter Sparrow.

References 

1898 births
1979 deaths
People from Oxfordshire
English gardeners
C. S. Lewis
British Army soldiers
British Army personnel of World War I
Military personnel from Oxfordshire